Oh Darling is an American pop quartet, based in Los Angeles, California.

History
Guitarist Daven Hall, singer and keyboardist Jasmine Ash, bassist J. Marie Hall and drummer Jake Endicott started making music together in 2006 in Portland, Oregon, and relocated to Los Angeles in 2009.

Their latest album, Brave the Sound, was recorded in the band's home studio in Echo Park, Los Angeles, and was produced by guitarist Daven Hall. Mixed by Nate Anderson, the record includes songs such as "Love" (featured on the ABC series Ugly Betty) and "Prettiest Thing", which was used in the soundtrack to Disney's film Prom (2011).

Songs from their previous albums have been featured on television series, including the CW's One Tree Hill, Lifetime's Drop Dead Diva and United States's Royal Pains.

The group has toured the West Coast, playing venues including the Doug Fir, The Viper Room, Spaceland and the Hotel Café. They have opened for The 88, Fitz and the Tantrums, Anya Marina and The Watson Twins.

Film and television
 Volkswagen national television commercial "Colorful Day"
 Ugly Betty television show "L.O.V.E." 
 Royal Pains television show "Colorful Day" and "Prettiest Thing"
 Prom (2011) "Prettiest Thing"

Discography

Albums
Nice Nice (2007)
Oh Darling (2009)
Brave the Sound (2011)
Beauty in Commotion (2013)

See also

 List of bands from Los Angeles
 Culture of Portland, Oregon
 Music of Los Angeles
 Music of Oregon

References

External links
 , the group's official website
 

2006 establishments in Oregon
21st-century American musicians
American pop music groups
Musical groups established in 2006
Musical groups from Los Angeles
Musical groups from Portland, Oregon
Musical quartets